Górzno is a town in Kuyavian-Pomeranian Voivodeship, north-central Poland.

Górzno may also refer to the following places:
Górzno, Leszno County in Greater Poland Voivodeship (west-central Poland)
Górzno, Masovian Voivodeship (east-central Poland)
Górzno, Ostrów Wielkopolski County in Greater Poland Voivodeship (west-central Poland)
Górzno, West Pomeranian Voivodeship (north-west Poland)
Górzno, Polish name for Göhren, Rügen (north-east Germany)